Sisters Who Make Waves 2 (Chinese: 乘风破浪的姐姐2; pinyin: Chéngfēngpòlàng De Jiějiě Èr) is the second season of Sisters Who Make Waves which premiered on January 23 in Mango TV. This season featured 30 celebrities over 30 who compete to form a seven-member girl group. The seven-member group formed on April 21, 2021, composed of Summer Jike, Wang Ou, Rainie Yang, Yang Yuying, Na Ying, Joey Yung and Bibi Zhou.

Concept 
Following the success of the first season last summer, Mango TV greenly a second season slated for premiere in January 2021. The season mostly follow similarities to the previous season, with overhaul and some improvements done on the last season.

Contestants 
Contestants with a known English name will be used, unless otherwise stated, names are arranged in surname based on romanized pinyin. All ages and years are at the time of the competition.

 – Break-in round contestant

Episodes

Episode 1 (Jan 22, 2021) 
In the first episode, 30 contestants performed a personal preliminary stage and were rated by four mentors: personal traits were scored by Mani Fok, group potential was scored by Du Hua, vocal performance was scored by Liu Zhuo, and stage performance was scored by Chen Qiyuan.

Results

Episode 2 (Jan 29, 2021) 
In preparation for the first public performance, the Challengers Team (those whose scores from Ep. 1 were in the lower half) challenges the Defenders Team (those whose scores from Ep. 1 were in the upper half). Depending on each team's score, the Challengers team will receive a certain amount of slots to switch positions. 

The Challengers team, led by Du Hua, are split up into three 5-person groups. Then, they are asked to pick two of the three songs given: "理所当然"(Regular) by WayV, "所有人都在玩手机" by 马赛克乐队, and "Mulan" by Lexie Liu. During the group evaluations, each contestant performs a section of the song they chose individually, and based on their individual performance, they are grouped into their respective five-person teams. 

The Defenders team, led by Huo Wenxi, are split up into five 3-person groups. Then, they are asked to pick from five songs given: "不屑完美" by A-Lin and 倪子冈, "在这里请你随意" by S.U.E., "归零"(Reset) by Sandy Lam, "现在不跳舞要干嘛" by Lala Hsu, and "A级娱乐" by A-Mei. Each of the five groups then practice for their respective song, with the performance order determined by the initial stage results.

Episode 3 (Feb 5, 2021) 
During the first public performance, the Challengers and Defenders Team face off against each other, with each audience member giving their vote to a performance during a 60-second period as well as three votes to the individual contestants. Throughout the performance rounds, the Challengers team has three chances to challenge the Defenders Team in order to earn slots for switching places. At the end, 5 contestants are temporarily eliminated: Angela An, Tang Jingmei, Liu Ye, Jennifer Li, and Michelle Dong. The three contestants in the Challengers Team who received the most individual votes– Yang Yuying, Cecilia Cheung, and Cheng Lisha– moved up to the Defenders Team. Meanwhile, the three contestants in the Defenders Team who received the least individual votes– Jiang Luxia, Zuo Xiaoqing, and Jin Qiaoqiao– moved down to the Challengers Team.

Episode 4 (Feb 12, 2021) 
In preparation for the second public performance, the remaining contestants are grouped into five groups of 5 based on self-selection and mutual selection (two 5-person groups in the Challengers team and three 5-person groups in the Defenders team). They then go through another round of pre-performance evaluations, and the group from the Challengers team with the lowest evaluation score will face the danger of switching places with the Defenders team if they rank last again in the performance.

Episode 5 (Feb 19, 2021) 
During the second public performance, the Challengers and Defenders Team face off against each other once more, with each audience member giving their vote to a performance during a 60-second period as well as three votes to the individual contestants. The Challengers team has the opportunity to choose which group from the Defenders team to challenge. If one out of the two Challenger teams successfully challenges the Defenders team by earning a higher score, the Challengers team will gain two position-switching slots; if both Challenger teams successfully challenges the Defenders team, there will be four position-switching slots gained. The team with the highest ranking earns the "safe" status and all its members advance to the next round, while the other teams face the danger of having at least one member eliminated.

Episode 6 (Feb 26, 2021) 
For the 3rd public performance, the members of the Break-In Challenge group are introduced: Rainie Yang, Sue Su, and Zeng Li. For the Defenders group, Natasha Na, whose team won 1st place last round, continues as one of the leaders while Bibi Zhou and Joey Yung, the contestants with the highest combined personal ranking, lead the remaining two teams. After the leaders pick their song choices, the remaining contestants pick their teams in order based on personal ranking, and are split into three 5-person groups. In the Challengers group, Monica Li was voted to be leader of a 5-person group. During the pre-performance evaluation, each of the four teams selects one person to perform, and depending on their evaluation result, each team earns different amounts of time to campaign for votes.

Episode 7 (Mar 5, 2021) 
The third public performance begins with the Break-In team showcasing their solo performances before the Defenders and Challengers team face off against each other. The group who receives the most votes becomes the Safe Team and all its members advance to the next round without the risk of being replaced by any of the Break-In team members. If the Break-In team receives more than 800 votes for their preliminary solos, they can choose to challenge any 3 of the teams excluding the Safe Team. Otherwise, they can choose to challenge any 2 of the teams excluding the Safe Team. 

At the end, Joey Yung's team received the highest performance score and became the Safe Team. Both the Challengers team and Break-In Challengers successfully challenged Bibi Zhou's team, leading to two contestants from the team to be eliminated. Ultimately, Rainie Yang was able to successfully break in, while Michelle Chen, Xian Zi, Dong Jie, and Jia Qing were eliminated.

References

2021 in Chinese music
2021 Chinese television seasons